is a railway station on the Nanao Line in Nanao, Ishikawa, Japan, operated by the West Japan Railway Company (JR West).

Lines

Station layout
The station consists of two opposed unnumbered ground-level side platforms connected by a footbridge. The station is unattended.

Platforms

Adjacent stations

History
The station opened on April 24, 1898. With the privatization of Japanese National Railways (JNR) on 1 April 1987, the station came under the control of JR West.

Surrounding area
Nanao Shinonome High School
Nanao Special Education School

See also
 List of railway stations in Japan

External links

  

Railway stations in Ishikawa Prefecture
Stations of West Japan Railway Company
Railway stations in Japan opened in 1898
Nanao Line
Nanao, Ishikawa